The Paraopeba River is a river in the state of Minas Gerais, Brazil. In the Tupi language "Para" means "great river or sea," and "peba" means "flat," together meaning "flat river".

The source of the river is situated south of the municipality of Cristiano Otoni, Minas Gerais. The mouth is at the Três Marias Dam in the municipality of Felixlândia in the same state. The most important tributaries are the Macaúba River, the Camapuã River and the Manso River (Minas Gerais). The Paraopeba River is one of the most important tributaries of the São Francisco River, ensuring the yearlong navigability of that river.

On 25 January 2019, the Brumadinho dam collapsed, resulting in exceedingly high heavy mineral levels, with hundreds of times the nominal levels of copper. These high levels left 120 kilometers (75 mi) of the river ecosystem incredibly toxic, leading to it being called a "dead river". High levels of lead and chromium where also found in the 20 kilometers (12 mi) nearest to the collapse.

See also
 List of rivers of Minas Gerais

References 

 Detailed Basin map (in Portuguese)

Rivers of Minas Gerais